This is a list of Old Boys of Christ Church Grammar School, they being notable former students of Christ Church Grammar School, an Anglican Church school in Claremont, a suburb of Perth, Western Australia.

The source of most of the information below about each Old Boy's years of attendance is the school's centenary history, published in 2010.

Vice Regal
Wayne Martin (1965–1969) – Lieutenant Governor of Western Australia

Academia and science

Rhodes Scholars
1967: Peter Edwards (1950–1962) – consultant historian, author
1974: Sir Rod Eddington (1963–1967) – CEO, Cathay Pacific, Ansett Airlines and British Airways, director, News Corporation

Others – academia and science
Irwin Lewis (1953–1956) – first indigenous person to attend the University of Western Australia
Andrew McGowan (1974–1978) – Dean and President of the Berkeley Divinity School at Yale, and McFaddin Professor of Anglican Studies at Yale Divinity School
Richard Pestell (1969–1975) – Professor of Oncology and Medicine, Director, Kimmel Cancer Center, Thomas Jefferson University, Philadelphia, USA
Ralph Simmonds (1959–1967) – Professor of Law, Murdoch University

Business
Sir Rod Eddington (1963–1967) – CEO, Cathay Pacific, Ansett Airlines and British Airways; director, News Corporation; Chairman, Infrastructure Australia
Andrew Forrest (1970–1977) – Chairman and CEO, Fortescue Metals Group; philanthropist (also attended Hale School)
David Hohnen (1963–1966) – founder, Cape Mentelle winery (winner, Jimmy Watson Memorial Trophy, 1983 and 1984) and Cloudy Bay Vineyards
Peter Holmes à Court (1974–1979) – CEO, Back Row Productions and Australian Agricultural Company
Michael Wright (1952–1956) – owner, Voyager Estate; philanthropist

Law

Chief Justice
Wayne Martin (1965–1969) – Chief Justice of Western Australia

Others – law

Ralph Simmonds (1959–1967) – Justice of the Supreme Court of Western Australia

Media, entertainment, culture and the arts
Piers Akerman (1960–1964) – journalist, editor (The Advertiser, Adelaide, The Sunday Herald Sun, Melbourne), columnist (The Daily Telegraph, Sydney) (also attended Guildford Grammar School)
Hal Colebatch (1954–1962) – author, poet, lecturer, journalist, editor, and lawyer
Jon Doust (1961–1965) – comedian, author
Richard Hassell (1979–1983) – architect and designer, co-founder and co-owner, WOHA, Singapore
Peter Holland (1960–1961) – radio and television presenter (ABC)
Andrew Jaspan (1964–1967) – journalist, Editor-in-Chief of The Age, Melbourne
Irwin Lewis (1953–1956) – indigenous Australian artist
David McComb (1967–1978) – singer, songwriter, The Triffids
Mark McEntee (1963–1970) – guitarist, Divinyls
Tim Minchin (1982–1992) – musician, comedian, composer
John Oldham (ca 1918) – landscape architect (also attended Guildford Grammar School)
Nelson Woss (1982–1986) – film producer (Heartland Film Festival Grand Prize Winner)
Nick Allbrook (2000–2004) – Band member of Tame Impala, frontman of Pond

Politics and public service

Cabinet ministers
Ken Baston (1960–1967) – Minister for Agriculture and Food and Minister for Fisheries, Barnett Ministry, Western Australia
Senator Ian Campbell (1976) – Minister in various portfolios, Second, Third and Fourth Howard Ministries, Australia (also attended Brisbane Grammar School)
Murray Criddle (1953–1961) – Minister for Transport in the Court-Cowan Ministry, Western Australia
Peter Foss (1958–1963) – Minister in various portfolios in the Court-Cowan Ministry, Western Australia
Doug Shave (1963–1964) – Minister in various portfolios in the Court-Cowan Ministry, Western Australia

Other Members of Parliament
Ric Charlesworth (1965–1969) – Member of the Australian House of Representatives for the Division of Perth
Senator Alan Eggleston (1953–1959) – Senator for Western Australia
Mal Washer (1961) – Member of the Australian House of Representatives for the Division of Moore

Others – politics and public service
Sir William Heseltine GCB GCVO AC QSO PC (1943–1946) – Private Secretary to Queen Elizabeth II, 1986–1990
Bruce Haigh (1956–1962) – diplomat, political analyst

Sport

Australian rules football
John Annear (1971–1976) – AFL football player (Collingwood, Richmond, West Coast Eagles)
Andrew Browne (1997–2001) – AFL football player (Fremantle)
Jaxon Crabb (1995–1996) – AFL football player (West Coast Eagles, Port Adelaide), Sandover Medallist, 2005
Tony Evans (1982–1986) – AFL football player (West Coast Eagles) (member, West Coast Eagles premiership teams, 1992 and 1994)
Chris Lewis (1984–1986) – AFL football player (West Coast Eagles) (member, West Coast Eagles premiership teams, 1992 and 1994)
Luke McPharlin (1995–1999) – AFL football player (Hawthorn and Fremantle)
Eric Mackenzie (2001–2005) – AFL football player (West Coast Eagles)
Tom Swift (1996–2007) – AFL football player (West Coast Eagles)
Ryan Turnbull (1981–1988) – AFL football player (West Coast Eagles), Sandover Medallist, 2001
Tim English (2015) – AFL Football player, Western Bulldogs

Basketball
Matt Burston (1995–1999) – NBL player (Perth Wildcats, South Dragons, Adelaide 36ers, Melbourne Tigers, Cairns Taipans)
Ben Purser (2003–2007) – NBL player (Perth Wildcats)

Cricket
Jim Allenby (1995–1999) – state and county cricketer (Durham Cricket Board, Leicestershire, Western Australia, Glamorgan)
Ric Charlesworth (1965–1969) – state cricketer (Western Australia (member of Sheffield Shield winning team, 1972–73, 1976–77, 1977–78))
Stuart MacGill (1981–1988) – international cricketer (Australia)
Daniel Marsh (1985–1990) – state and county cricketer (South Australia, Tasmania (captain 2002–03 to 2008–09, including of Pura Cup winning team, 2006–07), Leicestershire)
Ashton Turner (2010) – state cricketer (Western Australia, Perth Scorchers)
Stephen Eskinazi (2011) – county cricketer (Middlesex County Cricket Club)

Golf
Roger Mackay (1963–1973) – professional golfer; winner, Australian PGA Championship, 1987; WA Sportsman of the Year, 1991

Field hockey
Craig Boyne (2001–2005) – international player
Ric Charlesworth (1965–1969) – international player (Australia) and coach (Hockeyroos and Kookaburras); WA Sportsman of the Year, 1976, 1979, 1986 and 1987
Adam Froese – international player (Canada)
Scott Webster (1989–1993) – international player, including at the World Hockey Cup, 2002 (silver medallist)

Motor sport
Mike Thackwell (1972–1976) – racing driver; competed in F1, F2 (winner, European championship, 1984), F3000, F3, sports cars (winner, 1000km Nürburgring, 1986), CART

Olympics
Jim Battersby (1971–1976) – rowing (men's eight), Los Angeles 1984 (bronze medallist)
Ric Charlesworth (1965–1969) – hockey, Munich 1972, Montreal 1976 (silver medallist), Los Angeles 1984 (captain), Seoul 1988, Atlanta 1996 (Hockeyroos coach), Sydney 2000 (Hockeyroos coach), London 2012 (Kookaburras coach)
Tommaso D'Orsogna (2003–2007) – swimming, London 2012 (bronze medallist)
George Ford (2010) – water polo, Rio de Janeiro 2016
Adam Froese (2008) – hockey (Canada), Rio de Janeiro 2016 
Bill Kirby (1990–1992) – swimming, Sydney 2000 (gold medallist)
Miguel Porteous – freestyle skiing (New Zealand), Pyeongchang 2018
Nico Porteous – freestyle skiing (New Zealand), Pyeongchang 2018 (bronze medallist)
Todd Skipworth (1998–2002) – rowing (lightweight coxless four), London 2016, Rio de Janeiro 2016
Jonathan van Hazel (1988–1995) – swimming, Athens 2004
Robin Bell (1986–1994) – Canoe/Kayak/Slalom, Sydney 2000, Athens 2004, Beijing 2008 Bronze

Paralympics
Joshua Hofer OAM (1987–1991) – swimming, Madrid Paralympics 1992 (gold medallist)

Rugby league
Peter Holmes à Court (1974–1979) – co-owner and CEO of South Sydney Rabbitohs

Tennis
Darren Patten (1986–1987) – 1990 Australian Open, WA Challenge Cup Representative, Tennis Australia BP Achievers Squad, Western Australian Open Singles Winner.
David Culley (1982–1987) – WA Challenge Cup Representative, 10 x WA State league Winner, Western Australian Open Singles Winner.
Jaymon Crabb (1994–1995) – 1997, 2002,2003 Australian Open, Australian Davis Cup Assistant Coach. ATP #181 Singles.
Paul Kilderry (1985–1987) – ATP #138 Singles, ATP # Doubles 64, Australian Open, Wimbledon, US Open, French Open.
Brett Patten (1987–1988) –  WA Challenge Cup Representative, Tennis Australia AMT Platinum Singles Winner, WA State Closed Singles Winner, ITF 5 x Australian O/35 Singles and Doubles Champion

Water polo
George Ford (2010) – international player (Australia)
Nick O'Halloran (2000–2004) – international player (Australia), including at the FINA Water Polo World League, 2007 (bronze medallist)

Yachting
Peter Gilmour (1968–1977) – international yachtsman (including in the Americas Cup), WA Sportsman of the Year, 1987
Jon Sanders AO OBE (1952–1955) – yachtsman, circumnavigator

See also

 List of schools in Western Australia
 List of boarding schools
 Public Schools Association

References

External links
 Christ Church Grammar School website
 Christ Church Grammar School Old Boys Association website

Lists of people educated in Western Australia by school affiliation